Abzy Cool is a Hindi language Entertainment Channel That Was Owned By Skystar Entertainment Pvt Ltd.

Current Shows
Daravni Kahani
Om Namah Shivay

Former Shows
Aurat Teri Yehi Kahani
Jap Tap Vrat
Crime Stop
Pyar Mein Savdhaan
Mahima Maa Jagdambe Ki
Shree Ganesh

References

Skystar Entertainment
Hindi-language television channels in India
Television channels and stations established in 2018
Hindi-language television stations
Television channels based in Noida
2015 establishments in Delhi